Akamptogonus is a genus of flat-backed millipedes in the family Paradoxosomatidae. There are about 11 described species in Akamptogonus.

Species
These 11 species belong to the genus Akamptogonus:
 Akamptogonus austerus Attems, 1932
 Akamptogonus australianus (Chamberlin, 1920)
 Akamptogonus beauforti Attems, 1915
 Akamptogonus caragoon (Rowe & Sierwald, 2006)
 Akamptogonus continuus Attems, 1914
 Akamptogonus novarae (Humbert & DeSaussure, 1869)
 Akamptogonus rotornanus (Chamberlin, 1920)
 Akamptogonus sentaniensis Attems, 1917
 Akamptogonus signatus (Attems, 1897)
 Akamptogonus triaina (Attems, 1911)
 Akamptogonus vinctus Attems, 1933

References

Further reading

 
 

Polydesmida
Articles created by Qbugbot